James Bonar, known as Jim Bonar, (13 July 1862 – 1924) was a Scottish footballer who played in The Football League for Accrington.

Jim Bonar started his football career in Renfrewshire in 1883. He joined a club called Thornliebank who had reached the Scottish Cup final three years before. Jim Bonar signed for Accrington in 1884 and made his League debut on 8 September 1888 at Anfield, the then home of Everton. Accrington lost the match 2–1. Jim Bonar appeared in 17 of the 22 matches played by Accrington in 1888-1889 season. As a forward he played in a forward line that scored three League goals or more on seven separate occasions.

Jim Bonar left Accrington in 1889. There is no record of when he stopped playing football and any other career he pursued. He died in 1924, aged 60-61.

References

Scottish footballers
Accrington F.C. players
Scottish Football League players
Thornliebank F.C. players
1866 births
Association football forwards
Year of death missing